Dr. Ehsan Hoque (born March 13, 1964) is a medical doctor, social entrepreneur, and child rights activist. He is the founder and honorary executive director of Distressed Children & Infants International, an international non-profit organization based in the United States that works with underprivileged children and their families to stop child labor, extend educational opportunities, and provide access to healthcare.

Early life and education

Dr. Hoque was born in Barisal, Bangladesh to A.N. Shamsul Hoque (a professor of political science and public administration at Duke University, Dhaka University and at Rajshahi University) and Hasina Begum, in 1964. He was born with congenital cataracts, and by the age of five had undergone seven eye surgeries, which partially restored his vision. At the time cataract surgery was uncommon in Bangladesh. Despite his family and physician advising him against prolonged studying and suggested he not attend school due to his impaired vision, he persevered in his studies and by 1987 he had graduated from Rajshahi Medical College to become a medical doctor. He completed his Ph.D. in 1995 at Asahikawa Medical College (Japan) and his postdoctoral fellowship in 1997 at the University of Western Ontario (Canada).

Career
Over the course of his career, Dr. Hoque has worked at numerous institutes around the world, including Rajshahi Medical College Hospital (Bangladesh), Dhaka Shishu Hospital (Bangladesh), Asahikawa Medical University (Japan), University of Western Ontario (Canada), University of Toronto (Canada), and Yale University School of Medicine (USA). His research has focuses on cardiovascular pharmacology and physiology, concentrating on  ischemic reperfusion injury of the heart, and neuroendocrinology with a focus on aging. Dr. Hoque has published his work in various scientific journals and presented his findings at national and international conferences. He has also been the recipient of numerous academic honors, including a Monbusho Scholarship from the Japanese Ministry of Education, research awards from the Heart & Stroke Foundation of Ontario, the University of Toronto Research Fellowship, and the Hartford Foundation Fellowship. Dr. Hoque is now a dedicated activist for children's rights and serves as the Honorary Executive Director of a US based International non-profit organization Distressed Children & Infants International. He is also involved with research projects in ophthalmology, at Yale University with his colleague Dr. Brian DeBroff. He also serves as an Honorary Goodwill Ambassador and the International Consultant for the Rights and Sight for Children (RSC), the Tauri Foundation, the Thengamara Mohila Sabuj Sangha, and, several other human rights and disability rights organizations worldwide.  Dr. Hoque consistently advocates for those with disabilities and promotes inclusion efforts to normalize their lives and has received numerous academic honors and awards in recognition of his work. He is an active member of the Rotary Club of Cambridge, MA, USA. Currently, Dr. Hoque also serves as an Adjunct Professor & International Advisor of Bangladesh University of Health Sciences (BUHS).

Major scientific achievements
In 1995 Dr. Ehsan Hoque discovered that Lysophosphatidylcholine (LPC), a toxic substance which accumulates in the ischemic myocardium when applied exogenously, causes ischemia-like changes, suggesting that LPC is one of the important factors in producing ischemia-reperfusion derangements in terms of mechanical and metabolic functions. He also found that prevention of LPC accumulation can protect heart from ischemia/reperfusion injury.

In 1997 Dr. Ehsan Hoque was the first to demonstrate the potential protective effect of NHE (Na+-H+ Exchange) inhibition on Lysophosphatidylcholine (LPC) -induced cardiac injury.

Activism

As a young boy, Hoque was constantly bullied for wearing heavy eyeglasses and taking longer to do things due to poor vision. He cites this as a major source of his empathy for others who are disadvantaged through no fault of their own.

Living in Bangladesh, he was surrounded by people in poverty and developed a deep appreciation for his own life. In his words, "I feel so lucky that I had parents who could give me food, clean water, a bed to sleep in, and treatment so I could see. If I was born into a poor family I would not be able to see the world today."

At a very young age, he involved himself in charitable activities with several organizations. During high school, he created a volunteer group and started to help underprivileged people, especially during natural disasters common to the country like cyclones and floods.

As a young physician, Hoque undertook his own voluntary projects in remote villages teaching women about prenatal nutrition and distributing vegetable seeds and vitamin tablets to prevent the vitamin deficiency that contributed to his own partial blindness.

During these trips, he saw small children dropping out of school and being sent to work in factories or as maids to support their families. He saw many of these children abused and tortured by their employers.

In 1995, Hoque started supporting the education of 50 children to save them from child labor, and in the process realized a more systematic approach was necessary to help the many more children suffering the same fate in Bangladesh and elsewhere. This inspired him to form a non-governmental organization to prevent school dropouts on a large scale by providing comprehensive support through child sponsorship, creating a safety net, and involving school authorities and the community in the process.

This dream was realized in 2003, while working at Yale University, together with his wife Dr. Nina Hoque, he founded Distressed Children & Infants International, or DCI. The organization's mission is to reduce the extreme poverty that contributes to child labor by providing quality education, family support, and access to healthcare with a focus on eliminating preventable blindness.

Hoque's vision of child sponsorship has manifested itself in DCI's Sun Child Sponsorship Program, which now supports over 1500 children in Bangladesh. DCI operates several other programs in Bangladesh that provide healthcare, vision care, and orphan support, and also provides support to partner organizations with similar missions in India, Nepal, and Nicaragua. These efforts have benefited thousands of children and their families while also providing opportunities for American youth to connect with less fortunate around the world through volunteerism: a central organizational concept to DCI that Hoque calls "children helping children".

Hoque believes that to help the thousands of distressed children around the world the many organizations working in this field should be united in one platform to exchange ideas and learn from each other's approach, successes, and failures. This belief has manifested in the biennial Conference on Child Rights & Sight: an international conference hosted by DCI and Yale University to raise awareness about child rights, particularly with respect to child labor, and diseases that affect vision. The event gathers speakers and leaders from around the world to address these issues and discuss creative solutions. The 7th conference took place at Yale in October 2019.

Family

Hoque lives in Cambridge, Massachusetts with his wife Nina Hoque and their two beautiful daughters Asahi and Sofia.

Social and humanitarian awards
 Non-Resident Bangladeshis (NRB) Excellence Award, 2022
 Humanitarian Award by Bangladesh National Woman Lawyers' Association (BNWLA), 2022
 Special Recognition Award at Rotary International RID 3281, Conference, March 2022 
 Mother Teresa Golden Award, 2021
 Humanitarian Award by Bangladesh Association of New England (BANE), 2021
 Humanitarian Award by Rajshahi Government College in Bangladesh, 2020
 Humanitarian Award by City of Cambridge, Massachusetts, USA, 2019
 All European Bangladesh Association (AEBA) Humanitarian Award (2019)
 Tauri Foundation, Humanitarian Award (2019)
 Bangladesh Medical Association of North America (BMANA) New York Chapter Humanitarian Award (2018)
 Society of  Bangladeshi Doctors in Queensland, Bangladesh Medical Society of Australia, Humanitarian Award (2018)
 Bangladesh Medical Association of North America (BMANA) California Chapter Humanitarian Award (2017)
 ATN Bangla Television Humanitarian Award (2017)
 Rajshahi Medical College Humanitarian Award (2016)
 North America Bangladesh Convention (NABC) Award (2014)
 Federation of Bangladeshi Associations in North America (FOBANA) Outstanding Community Service Award (2013)
 Bangladesh Association of Phoenix Award (2012)
 Cheshire Exchange Club Award (2011)
 Bangladesh Unity Federation of Los Angeles (BUFLA) Charitable Service Award (2009)
 Federation of Bangladeshi Associations of North America (FOBANA) Commitment Award for Charity (2008)
 Bangladesh Association of Greater Kansas City Award (2007)
 Federation of Bangladeshi Associations in North America (FOBANA) Award (2007)
 Texas Chamber of Commerce Extraordinary Service Award for Deprived Children (2005)
 Rajshahi University Best Volunteer and Community Leader Award (1975)

Academic honors and awards
 Young Scientist Award: Hartford Foundation, US (2003)
 Research Fellowship Award: Hartford Foundation, US (2002-2005)
 Research Fellowship Award: Department of Internal Medicine, University of Toronto, Canada (2000-2002)
 Best Presentation Award: XVIII Annual Meeting of the International Society for Heart Research, Chicago, Illinois, US (1996)
 Postdoctoral Fellowship Award: Heart & Stroke Foundation of Ontario, Canada (1995-1998)
 Japanese Society of Medical Mycology Outstanding Researcher Award for oral presentation at the International Forum, Tokyo, Japan (1994)
 Monbusho Scholarship: Government of Japan (1990-1995)
 National Academic Merit Scholarship: Bangladesh Board of Education (1975-1987)

Scientific publications
He has published more than a dozen peer-reviewed articles in scholarly journals. The three most highly cited are:
  (cited 159 times)
  (cited 94 times)
  (cited 72 times)

References

1964 births
Living people
People from Barisal
Bangladeshi emigrants to the United States
People from Cheshire, Connecticut
Bangladeshi public health doctors